The 1901 Chicago Orphans season was the 30th season of the Chicago Orphans franchise, the 26th in the National League and the 9th at West Side Park. The Orphans finished sixth in the National League with a record of 53–86. The team was also known as the Remnants, due to many Orphans players leaving at the end of the 1900 season to join the upstart American League.

Regular season 
On June 20, 1901, Jack Taylor threw a complete game. This was the first of a major league record 187 consecutive complete games that he would pitch, a streak stretching well into the 1906 season.

Season standings

Record vs. opponents

Roster

Player stats

Batting

Starters by position 
Note: Pos = Position; G = Games played; AB = At bats; H = Hits; Avg. = Batting average; HR = Home runs; RBI = Runs batted in

Other batters 
Note: G = Games played; AB = At bats; H = Hits; Avg. = Batting average; HR = Home runs; RBI = Runs batted in

Pitching

Starting pitchers 
Note: G = Games pitched; IP = Innings pitched; W = Wins; L = Losses; ERA = Earned run average; SO = Strikeouts

Relief pitchers 
Note: G = Games pitched; W = Wins; L = Losses; SV = Saves; ERA = Earned run average; SO = Strikeouts

References

External links
1901 Chicago Orphans season at Baseball Reference

Chicago Cubs seasons
Chicago Orphans season
Chicago Cubs